Choristoneura jezoensis is a species of moth of the family Tortricidae. It is found on Hokkaido island in Japan.

The larvae feed on Abies sachalinensis, Picea jezoensis and Larix leptolepis.

References

Moths described in 1987
Choristoneura